Robert "Bubba" McDaniel (born May 3, 1983) is an American mixed martial artist who formerly fought as a Middleweight for the Ultimate Fighting Championship where he went (1–2). He was a member of FX's The Ultimate Fighter: Team Jones vs. Team Sonnen.

Mixed martial arts career

The Ultimate Fighter
In January 2013, it was announced that McDaniel was selected for The Ultimate Fighter: Team Jones vs. Team Sonnen.  To get into the TUF house, McDaniel defeated Ryan Bigler by TKO.  During the choosing of teams, he was the third pick of coach Jon Jones for Team Jones and sixth overall.

McDaniel faced eventual winner Kelvin Gastelum in the preliminary round. Despite being favored to win, McDaniel was submitted in the second round via rear-naked choke.

McDaniel was chosen by coach Jones for the wildcard spot and faced Kevin Casey. Bubba won via corner stoppage after Casey didn't answer the bell for the third round.

McDaniel lost via early KO to Uriah Hall in the quarterfinals.

Ultimate Fighting Championship
McDaniel made his UFC debut against castmate Gilbert Smith on April 13, 2013 at The Ultimate Fighter 17 Finale. He won the fight via submission in the third round.

McDaniel faced Brad Tavares on August 28, 2013  at UFC Fight Night 27. He lost the fight via unanimous decision.

McDaniel was expected to face TUF 17 castmate Tor Troéng on March 15, 2014 at UFC 171. However, Troéng was forced to pull out of the bout citing an injury. McDaniel instead faced UFC newcomer Sean Strickland. He lost the bout via submission in the first round and was subsequently released from the promotion.

Bellator MMA
Previous to fighting in the UFC, McDaniel appeared on an early Bellator MMA fight card in 2009. He faced William Chris Spicer at Bellator 6 and won the fight via rear-naked choke submission in the first round.

In May 2014, McDaniel signed with Bellator MMA. He made his return on June 6, 2014, facing Matt Jones at Bellator 121. He won the fight by unanimous decision.

McDaniel faced Emiliano Sordi on October 10, 2014 at Bellator 128. He lost via guillotine choke submission in the first round.

In his second fight for the promotion, McDaniel faced Kenyon Jackson at Bellator 146 on November 20, 2015. He won the fight via TKO in the second round.

After nearly two years away from Bellator, McDaniel will compete at Light Heavyweight when he replaces Muhammed Lawal against Liam McGeary at Bellator 185 on October 20, 2017. The following week, McGeary pulled out of the fight due to an injury.

Personal life
McDaniel's son, Wilder, passed away October 11, 2018 at two years old. Late October 2018, McDaniel was arrested for allegedly making terroristic threats against a man he believed killed his son.

In July 2021, Bubba's wife was arrested and charged with tampering or fabricating physical evidence and abandoning or endangering a child in relation to the death of Wilder.

Mixed martial arts record

|-
|Win
|align=center|30–10
|Leonardo Pecanha
|TKO (punches)
|Zak Cummings Promotions - Stronger Men's Conference 2018
|
|align=center|1
|align=center|2:45
|Springfield, Missouri, United States
|
|-
|Win
|align=center|29–10
|Juan Torres
|TKO (punches)
|Strike League 1: Fight Your Fight
|
|align=center|2
|align=center|4:16
|Cedar Park, Texas, United States
|Heavyweight debut.
|-
|Win
|align=center|28–10
|Andre Kavanaugh
|TKO (punches)
|Horsepower Promotions - Fists of Fury 13
|
|align=center|1
|align=center|2:21
|Lawton, Oklahoma, United States
|
|-
|Win
|align=center|27–10
|Kenyon Jackson
|TKO (punches)
|Bellator 146
|
|align=center|2
|align=center|4:14
|Thackerville, Oklahoma, United States
| Catchweight (195 lbs) bout
|-
| Loss
| align=center| 26–10
| Hayward Charles
| Submission (anaconda choke)
| HERO FC: Best of the Best VI
| 
| align=center|2
| align=center|3:27
| El Paso, Texas, United States
| For Hero FC Middleweight Championship
|-
| Win
| align=center| 26–9
| Kenyon Jackson
| Submission (choke)
| Legend Fights: Lopez vs. Alexander
| 
| align=center| 1
| align=center| 4:06
| Shawnee, Oklahoma, United States
| 
|-
| Win
| align=center| 25–9
| Edgar Verdin
| Submission (rear-naked choke)
| Fury Fighting 7: McDaniel vs. Verdin
| 
| align=center| 2
| align=center| 1:27
| Humble, Texas, United States
| Light Heavyweight bout
|-
| Win
| align=center| 24–9
| Marvin Babe
| TKO (punches)
| Horsepower Promotions: Fists of Fury 8
| 
| align=center| 1
| align=center| 3:45
| Woodward, Oklahoma, United States
| Light Heavyweight bout
|-
| Loss
| align=center| 23–9
| Emiliano Sordi
| Submission (guillotine choke)
| Bellator 128
| 
| align=center| 1
| align=center| 0:58
| Thackerville, Oklahoma, United States
| 
|-
| Win
| align=center| 23–8
| Ron Fields
| Submission (rear-naked choke)
| Extreme Combat Challenge: Fireworks
| 
| align=center| 2
| align=center| 1:55
| Indianapolis, Indiana, United States
| 
|-
| Win
| align=center| 22–8
| Matt Jones
| Decision (unanimous)
| Bellator 121
| 
| align=center| 3
| align=center| 5:00
| Thackerville, Oklahoma, United States
| Catchweight (190 lbs) bout
|-
| Loss
| align=center| 21–8
| Sean Strickland
| Submission (rear-naked choke)
| UFC 171
| 
| align=center| 1
| align=center| 4:33
| Dallas, Texas, United States
| 
|-
| Loss
| align=center| 21–7
| Brad Tavares
| Decision (unanimous)
| UFC Fight Night: Condit vs. Kampmann 2
| 
| align=center| 3
| align=center| 5:00
| Indianapolis, Indiana, United States
| 
|-
| Win
| align=center| 21–6
| Gilbert Smith
| Submission (triangle armbar)
| The Ultimate Fighter 17 Finale
| 
| align=center| 3
| align=center| 2:49
| Las Vegas, Nevada, United States
| 
|-
| Win
| align=center| 20–6
| Keith Cunagin
| Submission (guillotine choke)
| Legends of Fighting 53: Memorium
| 
| align=center| 1
| align=center| 2:32
| Indianapolis, Indiana, United States
| Catchweight (195 lbs) bout
|-
| Win
| align=center| 19–6
| Eric Schambari
| Decision (unanimous)
| Fight Game: Premier Event
| 
| align=center| 3
| align=center| 5:00
| Frisco, Texas, United States
| 
|-
| Win
| align=center| 18–6
| Johnny Rees
| Submission (rear-naked choke)
| Legends of Fighting 45: Line of Fire
| 
| align=center| 1
| align=center| 0:47
| Indianapolis, Indiana, United States
| 
|-
| Win
| align=center| 17–6
| Kyacey Uscola
| TKO (punches)
| Pure Fighting Championships 6
| 
| align=center| 2
| align=center| 3:28
| Red Deer, Alberta, Canada
| 
|-
| Win
| align=center| 16–6
| Rob Wince
| Submission (triangle choke)
| Ohio Fight Conference: Round 5
| 
| align=center| 2
| align=center| 2:08
| Columbus, Ohio, United States
| 
|-
| Win
| align=center| 15–6
| Nikolaos Rueve Boscarino
| Submission (americana)
| CNG Promotions: Queen City Meltdown
| 
| align=center| 2
| align=center| 2:35
| Cincinnati, Ohio, United States
| 
|-
| Loss
| align=center| 14–6
| Lucas Lopes
| KO (punches)
| MMA Big Show: A Prodigy Returns
| 
| align=center| 1
| align=center| 2:13
| Florence, Indiana, United States
| 
|-
| Win
| align=center| 14–5
| Billy Horne
| TKO (punches)
| MMA Big Show: Mayhem
| 
| align=center| 1
| align=center| 0:43
| Florence, Indiana, United States
| 
|-
| Win
| align=center| 13–5
| William Chris Spicer
| Submission (rear-naked-choke)
| Bellator 6
| 
| align=center| 1
| align=center| 2:53
| Robstown, Texas, United States
| 
|-
| Loss
| align=center| 12–5
| Alexander Shlemenko
| TKO (flying knee to the body)
| ShoXC: Elite Challenger Series
| 
| align=center| 1
| align=center| 5:00
| Hammond, Indiana, United States
| 
|-
| Win
| align=center| 12–4
| Kala Hose
| Submission (rear-naked-choke)
| EliteXC: Return of the King
| 
| align=center| 1
| align=center| 0:41
| Honolulu, Hawaii, United States
| 
|-
| Win
| align=center| 11–4
| Alex Cisne
| TKO 
| KOTC: Rising Stars
| 
| align=center| 2
| align=center| 2:37
| Devol, Oklahoma, United States
| 
|-
| Loss
| align=center| 10–4
| Tom Jones
| Submission (north-south choke)
| Freestyle Cage Fighting 17
| 
| align=center| 1
| align=center| 1:04
| Shawnee, Oklahoma, United States
| 
|-
| Loss
| align=center| 10–3
| Dan Molina
| Submission (heel hook)
| KOTC: Arch Rivals
| 
| align=center| 1
| align=center| 2:05
| Reno, Nevada, United States
| 
|-
| Win
| align=center| 10–2
| Blake Norsworthy
| TKO
| KOTC: Jawbreaker
| 
| align=center| 1
| align=center| 2:43
| Devol, Oklahoma, United States
| 
|-
| Win
| align=center| 9–2
| Mike Queen
| Submission (rear-naked-choke)
| Freestyle Cage Fighting 12
| 
| align=center| 3
| align=center| 1:03
| Shawnee, Oklahoma, United States
| 
|-
| Win
| align=center| 8–2
| Cody Malicott
| Submission 
| Big Chief Promotions
| 
| align=center| 1
| align=center| 0:45
| Tulsa, Oklahoma, United States
| 
|-
| Win
| align=center| 7–2
| Craig Cobb
| Submission (triangle choke)
| Freestyle Cage Fighting 10
| 
| align=center| 1
| align=center| 1:42
| Stillwater, Oklahoma, United States
| 
|-
| Loss
| align=center| 6–2
| Gerald Harris
| TKO (slam)
| Freestyle Cage Fighting 6
| 
| align=center| 2
| align=center| 4:55
| Tulsa, Oklahoma, United States
| 
|-
| Win
| align=center| 6–1
| Nick Budig
| Submission (rear-naked choke)
| Freestyle Cage Fighting: Brawl For It All 2
| 
| align=center| 2
| align=center| 2:18
| Tulsa, Oklahoma, United States
| 
|-
| Win
| align=center| 5–1
| Jeff McConnell
| Submission (rear-naked choke)
| Freestyle Cage Fighting: Brawl For It All
| 
| align=center| 1
| align=center| 1:26
| Tulsa, Oklahoma, United States
| 
|-
| Win
| align=center| 4–1
| Brandon McDowell
| Submission
| Ultimate Texas Showdown 5
| 
| align=center| 1
| align=center| 0:56
| Frisco, Texas, United States
| 
|-
| Win
| align=center| 3–1
| Allan McGuire
| Submission (armbar)
| American Cage Fighting: Showdown at Sundown
| 
| align=center| 1
| align=center| 0:27
| Stillwater, Oklahoma, United States
| 
|-
| Win
| align=center| 2–1
| Roger Kimes
| Submission (armbar)
| Xtreme Fighting League - EK 19: Battle at the Brady 3
| 
| align=center| 1
| align=center| 1:27
| Tulsa, Oklahoma, United States
| 
|-
| Loss
| align=center| 1–1
| Horace Spencer
| Submission (choke)
| Xtreme Fighting League
| 
| align=center| 1
| align=center| N/A
| Oklahoma, United States
| 
|-
| Win
| align=center| 1–0
| York Ash
| Submission (armbar)
| World Fighting Organization
| 
| align=center| 1
| align=center| N/A
| Oklahoma, United States
|

Kickboxing record

|-
|-  bgcolor="#FFBBBB"
| 2017-10-21 || Loss ||align=left| Kevin Holland || XKO 38 || Dallas, United States || KO (Spinning Back Elbow) || 1 || 1:29|| 0–1
|-
| colspan=9 | Legend:

Bare knuckle boxing record

|-
|Loss
|align=center|0–1
|Chris Camozzi	
|KO (punch)
|BKFC 31
|
|align=center|2
|align=center|0:37
|Broomfield, Colorado, United States
|
|-

See also
 List of current Bellator fighters

References

External links
 
 

1983 births
Living people
American male mixed martial artists
Mixed martial artists from Texas
Middleweight mixed martial artists
Mixed martial artists utilizing kickboxing
Ultimate Fighting Championship male fighters
People from Childress, Texas
People from Wichita Falls, Texas